Taylor is a surname of English origin. It is believed to have developed in England after the Norman invasion. Possibly coming from the Norman occupational surname (meaning tailor) in France. derived from the Old French tailleur ("cutter"), which derived from the Catalan Tauler meaning cutting board, or the Galician Tello meaning tile. The first historical evidence of the surname dates to the County of Somerset, South West England in 1182. "Taylor" is the fourth-most common surname in United Kingdom, fifth-most common in England, the 11th-most common in Scotland and the 22nd-most common in Wales. It is also common in other English-speaking countries (especially Australia, Canada, New Zealand, and the United States, where it was the tenth most frequently encountered surname in the 2000 US Census), but has a low incidence in Ireland, where it is mostly concentrated in the North. It is often the anglicized form of the German surname Schneider.

Geographical distribution
At the time of the United Kingdom Census of 1881, the frequency of the surname "Taylor" was highest in the following counties:
 1. Kincardineshire (1: 75)
 2. Kinross-shire (1: 89)
 3. Lancashire (1: 90)
 4. Worcestershire (1: 100)
 5. Orkney (1: 100)
 6. Aberdeenshire (1: 101)
 7. Derbyshire (1: 102)
 8. Banffshire (1: 103)
 9. Westmorland (1: 106)
 10. Herefordshire (1: 111)

As of 2014, the frequency of the surname was highest in the following countries and territories:

 1. Turks and Caicos Islands (1: 107)
 2. The Bahamas (1: 174)
 3. Montserrat (1: 214)
 4. Jamaica (1: 218)
 5. Liberia (1: 259)
 6. Guernsey (1: 280)
 7. Norfolk Island (1: 288)
 8. Saint Kitts and Nevis (1: 291)
 9. Barbados (1: 304)
 10. Scotland (1: 306)
 11. England (1: 310)
 12. Australia (1: 312)

As of 2014, 57.9% of all known bearers of the surname "Taylor" were residents of the United States. The frequency of the surname was higher than national average (1: 407) in the following U.S. states:

 1. Mississippi (1: 197)
 2. Tennessee (1: 212)
 3. Alabama (1: 224)
 4. West Virginia (1: 225)
 5. Arkansas (1: 229)
 6. Kentucky (1: 250)
 7. Utah (1: 252)
 8. Virginia (1: 255)
 9. South Carolina (1: 261)
 10. North Carolina (1: 270)
 11. Oklahoma (1: 274)
 12. Louisiana (1: 284)
 13. Delaware (1: 292)
 14. Maryland (1: 297)
 15. Idaho (1: 309)
 16. Georgia (1: 325)
 17. Indiana (1: 335)
 18. Missouri (1: 345)
 19. Texas (1: 355)
 20. D.C. (1: 359)
 21. Wyoming (1: 367)
 22. Ohio (1: 374)
 23. Kansas (1: 375)
 24. Michigan (1: 382)
 25. Oregon (1: 396)

The frequency of the surname was highest (over four times the national average) in the following U.S. counties:

 1. Wayne County, Utah (1: 25)
 2. Bacon County, Georgia (1: 31)
 3. Clay County, W.Va. (1: 47)
 4. Haywood County, Tenn. (1: 50)
 5. Borden County, Texas (1: 53)
 6. McCreary County, Ky. (1: 64)
 7. Dickens County, Texas (1: 64)
 8. Tallahatchie County, Miss. (1: 69)
 9. Thomas County, Neb. (1: 70)
 10. Yakutat, Alaska (1: 74)
 11. Accomack County, Va. (1: 74)
 12. Pleasants County, W. Va. (1: 74)
 13. Sussex County, Va. (1: 75)
 14. Noxubee County, Miss. (1: 76)
 15. Red River Parish, La. (1: 79)
 16. Roane County, W.Va. (1: 81)
 17. Ware County, Ga. (1: 82)
 18. Essex County, Va. (1: 82)
 19. Greene County, N.C. (1: 82)
 20. Washington County, Ala. (1: 84)
 21. Lauderdale County, Tenn. (1: 86)
 22. Judith Basin County, Mont. (1: 88)
 23. Buckingham County, Va. (1: 89)
 24. Lamar County, Ala. (1: 90)
 25. Lowndes County, Ala. (1: 90)
 26. Marion County, Ala. (1: 94)
 27. Martin County, N.C. (1: 94)
 28. Grayson County, Va. (1: 95)
 29. Jones County, N.C. (1: 95)
 30. Moore County, Tenn. (1: 95)
 31. Northampton County, N.C. (1: 99)
 32. Lenoir County, N.C. (1: 100)
 33. Bolivar County, Miss. (1: 100)
 34. Tunica County, Miss. (1: 101)
 35. DeKalb County, Tenn. (1: 101)

Lists of people and fictional characters
List of people with surname Taylor
List of fictional characters named Taylor

See also

Taylor (given name)
Tayler
Tailor (disambiguation)

References

English-language surnames
Surnames of Norman origin
Scottish surnames
Occupational surnames
English-language occupational surnames